Louis Gabriel Basso III  (born December 11, 1994) is an American actor, known for his roles in the Showtime series The Big C, the 2011 science fiction film Super 8, and the 2013 comedy-drama The Kings of Summer.

Early life
Basso was born in St. Louis, Missouri, the son of Marcie and Louis J. Basso Jr. He was homeschooled along with his two sisters, actresses Alexandra and Annalise Basso. His family attended Grace Doctrine Church in St. Charles, Missouri. Basso initially wanted to become a professional football player before he found acting.

Career
Basso played minor roles in two feature films in early 2007, while living in St. Louis: Meet Bill, starring Aaron Eckhart; and Alice Upside Down, starring Alyson Stoner. Basso's older sister Alexandria also had a role in the latter. He later moved with his mother and sisters to Los Angeles. He found representation his first week there, securing a lead role in the Dailymotion Kids web series Ghost Town.

Basso has had several television guest roles in popular series such as Nickelodeon's iCarly, and ABC's The Middle. From 2010 until 2013, he maintained a regular role in the Showtime comedy series The Big C, portraying Adam Jamison, the son of the lead character played by Laura Linney. He then starred as Hal Mitchell in the independent film Alabama Moon (2009), starring John Goodman and Clint Howard, directed by Tim McCanlies, and based on the best-selling novel by Watt Key.

Basso appeared in the J. J. Abrams science fiction adventure film Super 8 (2011), and Jordan Vogt-Roberts' comedy-drama The Kings of Summer (2013), which had its premiere at the 2013 Sundance Film Festival. He then appeared in Kyle Newman's action comedy Barely Lethal (2015), with Hailee Steinfeld and Dove Cameron. In September 2014, he joined the cast of Meg Ryan's directorial debut film Ithaca, alongside Tom Hanks. Basso also appeared in the courtroom drama film The Whole Truth (2016), directed by Courtney Hunt and starring Keanu Reeves and Renée Zellweger. In 2020, he starred as author J. D. Vance in Netflix' film adaptation Hillbilly Elegy.

In September 2021, Basso was added to the cast of Netflix's action-thriller film Trigger Warning directed by Mouly Surya. In November 2021, he was set to lead the political conspiracy thriller series The Night Agent with Luciane Buchanan on Netflix, created by Shawn Ryan and based on the 2019's New York Times bestselling novel of the same name by author Matthew Quirk.

Filmography

Film

Television

Web

References

External links

 

1994 births
21st-century American male actors
American male child actors
American male film actors
American male television actors
Living people
Male actors from St. Louis